Randa may refer to:
Jrarrat, Kotayk, Armenia, formerly Randa
Randa, Djibouti
Randa, Switzerland
Randa, Mallorca
Randa rockslides of 1991 (Switzerland)
Randa Accessories, an American company
Puig de Randa, a summit in the Balearic Islands
Nickname for red pandas

People 
 Randa, New Zealand rapper
 Joe Randa, American baseball player
 Rudolph T. Randa (1940-2016), United States District Court judge
 Tomáš Randa, Czech football player